Nkhata Bay is a district in the Northern Region of Malawi. The capital is Nkhata Bay. The district covers an area of 4,071 km.² and has a population of 164,761.

Lake Malawi bounds the district on the east. The western portion of the district lies in the Viphya Mountains.

Nkhata Bay District houses the charity group Ripple Africa in Mwaya and the charity Temwa, in Usisya.

Government and administrative divisions

There are six National Assembly constituencies in Nkhata Bay:

 Nkhata Bay - Central
 Nkhata Bay - North
 Nkhata Bay - North West
 Nkhata Bay - South
 Nkhata Bay - South East
 Nkhata Bay - West

Demographics 
At the time of the 2018 Census of Malawi, the distribution of the population of Nkhata Bay District by ethnic group was as follows:
 66.2% Tonga
 9.7% Tumbuka
 6.6% Chewa
 1.3% Lomwe
 1.2% Nkhonde
 1.1% Ngoni
 0.9% Yao
 0.7% Sukwa
 0.7% Lambya
 0.2% Mang'anja
 0.2% Nyanja
 0.2% Sena
 1.2% Others

Culture 
Nkhata Bay is populated by the Tonga. However some parts like Usisya have Tumbuka people. The predominant language is Chitonga. Other languages like Chitumbuka, Chichewa, Khobwe, English and kiyankhonde are also spoken. The people of Nkhata Bay have several dances that they play according to seasons. Some of the dominant cultural dances are Malipenga (men), Chilimika (women) and Honala. These dances are devoid of a religious attachment. They are danced for entertainment.

Economy 
The majority of the people in the district are agriculturalists growing cassava, which is their staple food. Apart from cassava they also grow groundnuts, bananas, maize, pigeon peas and millet. The people along the lake earn their living through fishing. They catch usipa, batala, utaka, bombe among others. Very few of the populace are in wage employment at Chombe and Vizara where tea and rubber are cultivated. 
Most of the times, 80% of the male active population goes to work in other countries such as Tanzania and South Africa.

Nkhata Bay much known by European tourists and regard it as Switzerland of Malawi due to its mild to moist weather and hilly terrain.

Notable residents 
Edgar Ching'oli Chirwa - Architect of Malawi Congress Party
Kanyama Chiume - Minister of Education and made strides to improve the Malawi Education Curriculum
Yesaya Zelenji Mwase -  father and founder of the Blackman's Church of African Presbytery now changed to Church of Africa Presbytery with Ching'oma as his church's headquarters. Great Angels Choir is a daughter of this church but is based in Lilongwe with Rev. Zonda as its current General Secretary.
Manowa Chirwa
Aleke Kadonaphani Banda-one of the district's most popular politicians. Was the district's most youngest person to go into journalism and is the brainchild of Blantyre Newspapers which came after Nyasaland Times.
Clements Kadalie, Trade Union leader in South Africa.
Wiseman Chijere Chirwa: professor
Wisdom Achimalemba Mawowa - another upcoming hero in Nkhata bay central.
Richard Banda SC is a Malawian barrister and former athlete. He is a judge who formerly served as Chief Justice of Malawi and Swaziland and as Minister of Justice in Malawi. He was president of the Commonwealth Magistrates' and Judges' Association and Commonwealth Secretariat Arbitral Tribunal. As a sportsman, Banda was a track and field athlete and soccer player. He is the spouse of the former President of Malawi, Joyce Banda and, as such, was the First Gentleman.

From Nkhata-bay we have seen football players make a cut in the national team and national Football league clubs as professionals, these are Richard Banda Mwanabola, Christopher Banda, Charles Phiri, John Banda, Spy Msisya, Zolo Msisya, Frank Banda, Ficher Kondowe, Micium Mhone without excluding famous players like Brain Malowe Ndau, Aaron Chulu, Charles Kheza, Joe Mkumbira Phiri, Abel Mkandawire who played in bigger clubs in the national Premier league of Malawi.

Gallery

References 

Districts of Malawi
Districts in Northern Region, Malawi